The Boston Harbor Association (TBHA) was a harbor advocacy group in Boston, Massachusetts. TBHA's goal was "to promote a clean, alive, and accessible Boston Harbor" through environmental protection programs and harbor activities, as well as providing public access to the harbor through the HarborWalk.

History 
The Boston Harbor Association was formed in 1973 by the League of Women Voters and the Boston Shipping Association. In 2016 the organization merged with the Boston Harbor Island Alliance to become Boston Harbor Now

HarborWalk 
The Boston HarborWalk is a 46.9 mile public walkway that runs along the shore of Boston Harbor through Boston's six waterfront neighborhoods. The HarborWalk provides waterfront access to the public, and is accompanied by amenities such as cafés, parks, and seating areas. City and state regulations require new developments in Boston to be set back from the edge of the harbor. The HarborWalk was constructed as a way to both follow the building regulations and provide a pedestrian path for sightseeing and commerce.

External links
The Boston Harbor Association
The Boston Harborwalk

References 

Boston Harbor
Environment of Massachusetts
Environmental organizations based in Massachusetts
Organizations based in Boston
Environmental organizations established in 1973
1973 establishments in Massachusetts